Martin Nannestad Jørgensen (born 9 June 1959) is a visual artist living and working in Copenhagen, Denmark. His main medium is textile.

Biography
Born in Östhammar, Sweden and growing up in Denmark and Greenland, Jørgensen received his education as a weaver by Kim Naver in Copenhagen 1978–80 and Jette Gemzøe 1981, Dona Paula Sanches in Guatemala 1980–81, and professor Shizuko Oshiro in Okinawa, Japan 1986–87.

Work

Tapestries

Weilbach's Biographical Dictionary of Artists describes Jørgensen as "one of the young tapestry weavers about to revitalize a tradition that would otherwise be in danger of extinction". His commissioned works can be seen at University of Copenhagen, the Danish Ministry of Justice and the Danish Supreme Court.

Ecclesiastical textile
Jørgensen has designed and produced vestments, floor coverings, and antependia for e.g. Trinitatis Church in Copenhagen, Rungsted Church, and St. Clemens' Church in Randers.

Exhibitions

1984 Solo exhibition at the Craft Council of Copenhagen
1985 Charlottenborg Spring Exhibition, Copenhagen
1985 “Fall Exhibition”, Charlottenborg Exhibition Space, Copenhagen
1986–1987 ”Dänische Webteppiche” Hannover and Cologne, Germany
1987 ”Danish Genuine Carpets Exhibition”, Copenhagen
1987–1988 Danish Ministry of Culture's Travelling Exhibition in France
1988 ”Thread in space”, Danish Ministry of Culture Gallery, Copenhagen
1989 “The State Art Foundation 25th year anniversary exhibition”, Copenhagen
1991 “Tapestries”, group show at Munkeruphus Gallery, Dronningmølle
1993 Project ”Blood on Ice”, Thule, Greenland
1995 Project ”Blood on Ice” continued, Thule, Greenland
1996 ”Hand-Shake”, Textile installations in Andersen's Water Tower, Copenhagen
1997 “Blood Show” at Bille Brahe's Outdoor Slide Gallery, Copenhagen
1997 “Danish Crafts and Design Exhibition”, St. Petersburg, Russia
2001 “Remixing a Scene”, video installation, Copenhagen
2002 ”Contemplation Room”, video installation, Danish Ministry of Culture Gallery, Copenhagen
2005 Participating with the video “Movements” in Tromanale Film Festival, Berlin
2005 Solo exhibition: “Art- Industry- Museum”, Museum of Applied Art, Copenhagen
2019 Solo exhibition: Slow Art, Rundetaarn, Copenhagen
2021 Cordis Prize for Tapestry - Inverleith House Edinburgh, Scotland
2022 participating in censored exhibition Fibremen 7,  Ivano-Frankivsk, Ukraine

References

External links
 Official website

1959 births
Living people
Artists from Copenhagen
Danish textile artists
Danish designers
Danish tapestry artists
Danish weavers
Danish contemporary artists
Danish male artists
20th-century Danish artists
21st-century Danish artists
20th-century textile artists
21st-century textile artists
People from Östhammar Municipality
20th-century Danish male artists